This list of the Mesozoic life of North Carolina contains the various prehistoric life-forms whose fossilized remains have been reported from within the US state of North Carolina and are between 252.17 and 66 million years of age.

A

 Acesta
 †Achrostichites – or unidentified comparable form
 †Achrostichites linnaeafolius
 Acirsa
 †Acutostrea
 †Acutostrea plumosa
  †Adocus
  †Aetosaurus
 †Aldebarania – type locality for genus
 †Aldebarania arenitea – type locality for species
 †Alinka – type locality for genus
 †Alinka cara – type locality for species
 †Alisporites
 †Alisporites ovatus
 †Ambigostrea
 †Ambigostrea sloani
 †Ambigostrea tecticosta
  †Ampullina – tentative report
 Amuletum – tentative report
 †Anchura
 †Androvettia
 †Androvettia carolinensis
 †Androvettia statenensis
  †Anomia
 †Anomia argentaria
 †Anomia fearensis
 †Anomia fulleri
 †Anomia linifera
 †Anomia lintea
 †Anomia lintea donohuensis
 †Anomia olmstedi
 †Anomia ornata
 †Anomia penderana
 †Anomia tellinoides
 †Anomoeodus
 †Anomoeodus phaseolus
 Anteglosia – tentative report
 †Apatopus
 †Apatopus lineatus
 †Aphrodina
 †Aphrodina tippana
 †Arca
 †Arca bladensis
  Architectonica
 †Architipula
 †Architipula youngi – type locality for species
  †Arganodus
 †Argyrarachne – type locality for genus
 †Argyrarachne solitus – type locality for species
 Astarte – tentative report
  †Asteracanthus
 Ataphrus
 †Ataphrus kerri
 †Atreipus
 †Atreipus milfordensis

B

 †Baena – tentative report
  †Baikuris – report made of unidentified related form or using admittedly obsolete nomenclature
  Barbatia
 †Barbatia carolinensis
  †Belemnitella
 †Belemnitella americana
 †Beretra
  †Borealosuchus
 †Borealosuchus formidabilis
 †Boreogomphodon
 †Boreogomphodon jeffersoni
 †Bothremys
 †Bothremys cooki
 Botula
 †Botula carolinensis
 †Brachiophyllum
 †Brachychirotherium – or unidentified comparable form
 †Brachymeris
 †Brachymeris alta
 †Brachyphyllum
 †Brachyphyllum squammosum
 †Brachyphyllum squamosum
 †Brachyrhizodus
 †Brachyrhizodus wichitaensis
 †Brachyrhizodus witchitaensis
 †Brachyrhyphus – type locality for genus
 †Brachyrhyphus distortus – type locality for species
 †Buccinopsis
 †Buccinopsis globosa

C

 Caestocorbula
 †Caestocorbula crassiplica
 †Caestocorbula williardi
 Callucina
 †Callucina ripleyana
 †Camptonectes
 †Camptonectes berryi – tentative report
 †Camptonectes bubonis
 †Camptonectes hilgardi
 Candona
 †Candona rogersii
 †Cantioscyllium 
 †Cantioscyllium clementsi – type locality for species
  Carcharias – tentative report
 
  †Carnufex – type locality for genus
 †Carnufex carolinensis – type locality for species
 Caryocorbula
 †Caryocorbula oxynema
  Cerithiella
 †Cerithiella imlayi
 †Cerithiella nodoliratum
 †Cerithiella semirugatum
 †Cerithioderma
 †Chedighaii
 †Chedighaii barberi
 †Chedignaii
 †Chedignaii hutchisoni
  †Cimolomys
 †Cionichthys
  Cladophlebis
 †Cladophlebis microphylla
 Cliona
 †Coahomasuchus
 †Colognathus
 †Colognathus obscurus
 †Compostrobus – or unidentified comparable form
 †Compostrobus neotericus
 †Compsosaurus – type locality for genus
 †Compsosaurus priscus – type locality for species
 †Compsostrobus
 †Compsostrobus neotericus – type locality for species
 Corbula
 †Corbula carolinensis – tentative report
 †Corbula subgibbosa – tentative report
 †Costellacesta
 †Costellacesta insolita
 Crassatella
 †Crassatella hodgei
 †Crassatella neusensis
 †Crassatella vadosa
 †Crenella
 †Crenella mitchelli
 †Crenella serica
  †Cretolamna
 †Cretolamna appendiculata lata
 †Cretolamna biauriculata
 †Cretolamna serrata
 †Crosaphis
 †Crosaphis virginiensis
  †Crosbysaurus
  Cucullaea
 †Cucullaea capax
 †Cyathofoma
 Cylichna
 †Cylindracanthus
 †Cylindracanthus rectus
 †Cymbophora
 †Cymbophora cancellosa
 †Cymbophora conradi
 †Cymbophora trigonalis
 †Cymella
 †Cyprimeria
 †Cyprimeria coonensis
 †Cyprimeria depressa
 †Cyprimeria gabbi
 Cyzicus

D

 †Darwinula
  †Deinosuchus
 †Deinosuchus rugosus
 Dictyocephalus – type locality for genus
 †Dictyocephalus elegans – type locality for species
 †Dictyophyllum
  †Diplurus
 †Diplurus newarki – or unidentified comparable form
 †Dreissena – tentative report
 †Dromatherium – type locality for genus
 †Dromatherium sylvestre – type locality for species
 †Dromicosuchus – type locality for genus
 †Dromicosuchus grallator – type locality for species

E

 †Egertonia
 †Elatocladus – or unidentified comparable form
  †Enchodus
 †Enchodus petrosus – or unidentified comparable form
 †Equisetum
 †Estheria
 †Estheria ovata
 †Etea
 †Etea grandis
 †Euspira
 †Euspira rectilabrum
  †Eutrephoceras
 †Eutrephoceras dekayi
 †Exogyra
 †Exogyra cancellata
 †Exogyra costata
 †Exogyra costata spinosa
 †Exogyra ponderosa erraticostata

F

 †Flemingostrea
 †Flemingostrea blackensis
 †Flemingostrea pratti
 †Flemingostrea subspatula
 †Flemingostrea subspatulata
 †Franxinopsis

G

 Gegania
 †Geinitzia
 †Geinitzia reichenbachii
  Glycymeris
 †Glycymeris subgyrata
 †Gorgetosuchus – type locality for genus
 †Gorgetosuchus pekinensis – type locality for species
  †Gorgosaurus
 †Graciliala
 †Graciliala johnsoni – tentative report
 †Granocardium
 †Granocardium alabamense
 Gyrodes
 †Gyrotropis
 †Gyrotropis kerri

H

 †Hadrosaurus
 †Hadrosaurus minor – tentative report
  †Halisaurus
 †Hamulus
 †Hamulus onyx
 †Hamulus walkerensis
 †Harduinia
 †Harduinia kellumi
 †Harduinia moretonis
 †Harduinia mortonis
 †Himeriella – or unidentified comparable form
 †Hybodus
 †Hybodus montanensis
 †Hypolophus
 †Hypophylloceras
  †Hypsibema – type locality for genus
 †Hypsibema crassicauda – type locality for species

I

  †Inoceramus
 †Ischyodus
 †Ischyodus bifurcatus – or unidentified comparable form
 †Ischyrhiza
 †Ischyrhiza mira
 Isognomon
 †Isognomon holmesi
 Isurus

L

 †Laccopteris
 †Laccopteris smithii
 †Lamellaptychus
 †Lamellaptychus beyrichodidayi
 †Laxispira
 †Laxispira monilifera
 †Leehermania – type locality for genus
 †Leehermania prorova – type locality for species
 †Legumen
 †Legumen carolinensis – tentative report
 †Legumen concentricum
  †Leidyosuchus – tentative report
 †Lepacyclotes
 †Lepidodendron
 †Leptocycas – type locality for genus
 †Leptocycas gracilis – type locality for species
 †Leptosolen
 †Leptosolen biplicata
 Lima
 †Lima oxypleura
 †Lima pelagica
 Limatula
 †Limatula acutilineata
 Limopsis
 †Limopsis meeki
 †Linearis
 †Linearis magnoliensis
 †Linearis metastriata
  †Lingula
 †Linthia
 †Linthia variabilis
 †Liopeplum
 †Liopeplum tarensis
 †Liothyris
 †Liothyris carolinensis
 †Liriodendroidea
 †Liriodendroidea carolinensis – type locality for species
 †Liriodendroidea latirapha – type locality for species
 †Lonchopteris
 †Lonchopteris virginiensis
  Lopha
 †Lopha falcata
 †Lowenstamia
 †Lowenstamia liratus – tentative report
 †Lucasuchus
 †Lucasuchus hunti
 †Lucina
 †Lucina repleyana
  †Lytoceras

M

 Martesia – tentative report
 †Mecistotrachelos
 †Mecistotrachelos apeoros
 Melanatria – tentative report
 †Metarchilimonia
 †Metarchilimonia krzeminskorum
 †Metarchilimonia solita
 †Metreophyllum
 †Micrabacia
 †Microconodon – type locality for genus
 †Microconodon tenuirostris – type locality for species
 †Morea
 †Morea cancellaria
 †Moriconia
 †Moriconia cyclotoxon
 †Mormolucoides
 †Mormolucoides articulatus
  †Mosasaurus
 †Mosasaurus impar

N

 †Napulus
 †Nemodon
 †Nemodon brevifrons
  †Neocalamites
 †Neocalamites knowltoni
 †Neocalamites knowtonii – or unidentified comparable form
 †Neocalamites virginiensis
  Nerita
 Nucula
 †Nucula stantoni
 Nuculana
 †Nuculana kerrensis
 †Nuculana multiconcentrica
 †Nymphalucina
 †Nymphalucina parva

O

  Odontaspis
 †Odontaspis samhammeri
 †Opertochasma
  †Ornithomimus – tentative report
 †Ornopsis
 †Osteopleurus
 Ostrea
 †Ostrea sloani
 †Otozamites
 †Otozamites hespera
 †Otozamites powelli

P

  †Pagiophyllum
 †Pagiophyllum diffusum
 †Pagiophyllum simpsoniae
 †Paladmete – or unidentified comparable form
 †Paladmete gardnerae
 †Palaeolimnadia – tentative report
 †Palinandromeda
 †Palinandromeda novaecaesareae
 †Pannaulika
 †Pannaulika triassic
 Panopea
 †Panopea decisa
 †Panopea monmouthensis
 †Paralbula
 †Paralbula casei
 †Paranomia
 †Paranomia scabra
 †Pariostegus – or unidentified comparable form
 †Parmicorbula
 †Parmicorbula bisulcata – tentative report
 †Parmicorbula suffalciata
 †Pekinopteris – type locality for genus
 †Pekinopteris auriculata – type locality for species
 †Pekinosaurus – type locality for genus
 †Pekinosaurus olseni – type locality for species
 †Pelourdea
 Phacoides
 †Phacoides glebula
 †Phlebopteris
 †Phlebopteris smithii
 Pholadidea – tentative report
  Pholadomya
 †Pholadomya littlei
 †Pholadomya sublevis
 Phyllodus
 †Phyloblatta
 †Phyloblatta grimaldii – type locality for species
 †Pinna
  †Placenticeras – tentative report
  †Placerias
 †Placerias hesternus
 †Platananthus
 †Platananthus hueberi – type locality for species
 †Platanocarpus
 †Platanocarpus carolinensis – type locality for species
  †Platecarpus
 †Pleuriocardia
 †Pleuriocardia donohuense
 †Pleuriocardia donohuensis
 †Pleuriocardia penderense
 †Plicatolamna
 †Plicatolamna arcuata – or unidentified comparable form
 †Plinthogomphodon – type locality for genus
 †Plinthogomphodon herpetairus – type locality for species
 †Podozamites
  Polinices
 †Postligata
 †Postligata greenensis
  †Postosuchus
 †Postosuchus alisonae – type locality for species
  †Prognathodon
 †Prosechamyia
 †Prosechamyia dimedia
 †Prosechamyia trimedia
 †Protocardia
 †Protocardia spillmani
 †Protodonax
 †Pseudoctenis
 †Pseudolimea
 †Pseudolimea kerri
 †Pseudolimea reticulata
 †Pseudopolycentropodes – type locality for genus
 †Pseudopolycentropodes virginicus – type locality for species
 †Pteria – tentative report
 †Pterocerella
 †Pterophyllum
 †Pterotrigonia
 †Pterotrigonia bartrami – tentative report
 †Pterotrigonia cerulea
 †Pterotrigonia eufalensis
 †Pterotrigonia eufaulensis
 †Pugnellus
 Pycnodonte
 †Pycnodonte belli
 †Pycnodonte vesicularis
 †Pyrgulifera – tentative report
 †Pyropsis

R

 †Radiopecten
 †Radiopecten mississippiensis
 †Radiopecten quinquinarius
  †Revueltosaurus
 †Revueltosaurus olseni
 †Rhombodus
 †Rhombodus binkhorsti – or unidentified comparable form
 †Rhombodus laevis
 †Rostellites
  †Rutiodon – type locality for genus
 †Rutiodon carolinensis – type locality for species

S

  †Saurodon
  †Scapanorhynchus
 †Scapanorhynchus texanus
 †Schizoneura
 †Schizoneura virginiensis
 †Scoyenia – tentative report
  †Semionotus
 Serpula
 †Serpula cretacea
 †Solyma
 †Solyma elliptica
 †Solyma levis
 †Sphaenobaeria
 †Sphenodiscus
 †Sphenozamites
 †Spirematospermum
 †Spirematospermum chandlerae
  Squalicorax
 †Squalicorax kaupi
 †Squalicorax pristodontus
 Squatina
 †Squatina hassei
 †Stegomus
 †Stegomus arcuatus
 †Stephanodus
 †Stephanophyllia
 †Stephanophyllia cribraria – type locality for species
 Striarca
 †Striaticostatum
 †Syncyclonema
 †Syncyclonema simplicius
 †Synodontaspis
 †Synodontaspis holmdelensis
 †Synorichthys

T

 †Tanytrachelos – type locality for genus
 †Tanytrachelos ahynis – type locality for species
 †Taphrosphys
 †Taphrosphys dares – type locality for species
 †Tellinimera
 †Tellinimera gabbi
 †Tellinimera stephensoni
  Trachycardium
 †Trachycardium carolinensis
 †Trachycardium longstreeti
 †Trachycardium vaughani
 †Trachytriton – tentative report
 †Triassopsychoda
 †Triassopsychoda olseni
 †Triassothrips – type locality for genus
 †Triassothrips virginicus – type locality for species
 Trichotropis
 †Trichotropis squamosa
 †Trigonarca
 †Trigonarca elongata
 †Trigonarca maconensis
 †Trigonarca triquetra
 †Trigonia – tentative report
 Trionyx
 †Trionyx halophilus
  Turritella
 †Turritella kerrensis
 †Turritella quadrilira
 †Turritella trilira
 †Turseodus
  †Tylosaurus

U

 †Uatchitodon
 †Uatchitodon schneideri – type locality for species
 †Uddenia
 †Uddenia carolinensis
 †Unicardium
 †Unicardium neusensis

V

 †Variseila – or unidentified comparable form
 †Variseila meeki
 †Veniella
 †Veniella conradi
 †Veniella mullinensis
 †Veriplecia
 †Veriplecia rugosa
 †Vetericardiella
 †Virginiptera
 †Virginiptera certa
 †Virginiptera lativentra – type locality for species
 †Virginiptera similis
 †Voltzia
 †Voltzia andrewsii – type locality for species

W

 †Williamsonia
 †Wingatea

X

  †Xiphactinus
 †Xiphactinus audax
 †Xiphactinus vetus

Y

 †Yalea – type locality for genus
 †Yalea argentata – type locality for species
 †Yalea rectimedia

Z

 †Zamiostrobus – or unidentified comparable form
 †Zamiostrobus lissocardus
  †Zamites
 †Zamites powelli

References

 

Mesozoic
North Carolina